The Campionati Internazionali di Sicilia or International Championships of Sicily, also known as the Palermo Open, was a men's professional tennis tournament held annually at the Circolo Tennis Palermo in Palermo in Italy. Held from 1935 until 2006, the tournament was played on outdoor clay courts and was a part of the ATP Tour schedule from 1990 to 2006. The event was part of the ATP World Series from 1990 until 1999 and part of its successor, the ATP International Series, from 2000 until its final edition in 2006. That year the ATP bought back the tournament sanction.

In 1955 the Campionati Internazionali di Sicilia were disputed in Messina and won among the men Nicola Pietrangeli who beat in final Fausto Gardini in five sets, and in female tournament Silvana Lazzarino that won in final against Lea Pericoli.

Past finals

Singles

Doubles

See also
 Sicilia Classic – men's challenger tournament
 Internazionali Femminili di Palermo – women's tournament

References

External links
 Campionati Internazionali di Sicilia at circolotennis.palermo.it 

 
Grand Prix tennis circuit
Defunct tennis tournaments in Italy
Tennis tournaments in Italy
Clay court tennis tournaments
Sport in Sicily
ATP Tour